Kürthy is a Hungarian surname. Notable people with the surname include:

András Kürthy, Hungarian opera stage director
György Kürthy (1882–1972), Hungarian actor
József Kürthy (1881–1939), Hungarian actor
Lajos Kürthy (born 1986), Hungarian shot putter

Hungarian-language surnames